The Costa Rican Cup (Torneo de Copa de Costa Rica) is the top knock-out football tournament in Costa Rica which also serves as a qualification to the Supercopa Centroamericana.

It was played for three seasons from 2013 to 2015. A 2019 edition was announced, with the winner earning a berth to the CONCACAF League, but it was ultimately abandoned. The tournament returned in 2022.

Champions

References

 
Cup
Costa Rica